The Diego Garcia and Chagos Islands Council is a provisional Chagossian civilian government for the Chagos Islands.

Elections were first held in 2011, and a cabinet was formed.  The council currently provides help and services to the Chagossian diaspora, and in the future intends to operate as a self-governing British overseas territory.

References

External links
 Official website

Exile organizations
British Indian Ocean Territory
Chagossian people